Marfil (Spanish "ivory") may refer to:

Marfil (band), a Costa Rican music group
Marfil (film), a 2011 documentary from Equatorial Guinea
Marfil Lake, a lake on the border between Brazil and Bolivia
Marfil Tekstil (company), a fabric wholesaler located in Istanbul, Turkey
Marfil or Marfeil, an uthra in Mandaeism